Freziera undulata is a species of flowering plants in the family Pentaphylacaceae. It is found in the Caribbean (Dominica, Guadeloupe, Saba, St. Kitts, Grenada, Martinique, St. Vincent).

References

External links 
 Freziera undulata at The Plant List
 Freziera undulata at Tropicos

undulata
Plants described in 1799
Flora of the Caribbean
Flora without expected TNC conservation status